Lucy Vinis (born 1952/53) is an American politician. She was elected mayor of Eugene, Oregon, in 2016, and started her term in January 2017.

Education
Vinis is a graduate of Kenyon College in Ohio and earned master's degrees from the University of Maryland and the University of Michigan.

Career
Her position as mayor of Eugene is her first time in public office. She is a member of the Democratic Party.

During the May 2020 George Floyd protests in Eugene, the city's police injured a reporter from the Eugene Weekly who was documenting the demonstrations, who in turn filed a lawsuit against the city. Subsequently, six protestors also sued the City and the Eugene Police Department for gassing, shooting them with rubber bullets, and arresting them in a way that allegedly violated their civil rights.

On July 27, 2020, after the Eugene City Council deadlocked at 4-4 on a vote to refer a measure allowing STAR voting to be used in city elections to the November 2020 ballot, Vinis cast the deciding vote against the referral.

Personal life
Vinis has lived in Eugene since 1991. She has worked for non-profit organizations in Eugene, including EarthShare of Oregon, Northwest Coalition for Alternatives to Pesticides, and ShelterCare.

Electoral history

References

External links
 

Mayors of Eugene, Oregon
Women mayors of places in Oregon
Oregon Democrats
21st-century American politicians
21st-century American women politicians
Kenyon College alumni
University of Maryland, College Park alumni
University of Michigan alumni
Living people
1950s births